Rika Fujiwara and Yuki Naito were the two-time defending champions, having won the previous editions in 2016 and 2017, however both players chose not to participate.

Choi Ji-hee and Han Na-lae won the title, defeating Haruka Kaji and Junri Namigata in the final, 6–3, 6–3.

Seeds

Draw

Draw

References
Main Draw

Ando Securities Open - Doubles